The Volleyball Australia, formerly known as Australian Volleyball Federation, is the national governing body for volleyball in Australia. Founded in 1963, the AVF is responsible for maintaining national Volleyball competitions, alongside state level associations.

Australian State Organisations 
Volleyball South Australia

Volleyball Western Australia

References

External links
 

Australia
Volleyball
Volleyball in Australia
1963 establishments in Australia
Sports organizations established in 1963